Klavika is a family of sans-serif fonts designed by Eric Olson and released by Process Type Foundry in 2004. It contains four weights: light, regular, medium, and bold (with corresponding italics) and variations of numerals.

The family of typefaces is described as straight-sided technical sans-serifs flexible for editorial and identity design.

The capital G has no bar, the capital Q has a tail at the bottom, the lowercase g is double story, and the lowercase k has diagonal strokes that meet at the vertical, with a gap.

Features
Old-style and small cap numerals (with tabular)
Small caps
True italics
Multiple language support
Full set of arrows
Available in OpenType, TrueType, PostScript, WOFF and EOT formats.

In use

The "GALAXY" in the original Samsung Galaxy logo used Klavika Basic Light as the font with the only modification being that the "L" has a rounded corner. Later it was phased out and replaced by custom-made typography, especially Samsung Sharp Sans for product logos and Samsung One in advertising materials.
The Facebook logo uses a modified version of Klavika Bold.
The old DeviantArt logo used slightly modified regular and bold versions of this Klavika.
The American TV network NBC used Klavika for on-screen branding in 2006 but has since changed its primary typeface several times. Its cable channels MSNBC and CNBC also use the font.
The American cable channel ESPN uses Klavika for on-screen presentation from 2009; by 2014, they had switched to Helvetica.
Belgian Dutch language television channel VTM uses Klavika for on-screen branding and, since 2011, also on the news graphics.
Moses Mabhida Stadium in Durban, South Africa used Klavika in the signage during 2010 FIFA World Cup.
South Korean bid for 2022 FIFA World Cup used Klavika for the presentation in Latin alphabets.
Chevrolet uses a customized version of Klavika as a corporate typeface. One noticeable difference is the shape of the capital M which has straight rather than splayed sides. For Greek and Cyrillic alphabets, however, local Chevrolet dealers—in Greece and some of the countries using Cyrillic—uses some typefaces similar to Klavika. The condensed fonts were designed by Process Type Foundry LLC with Aaron Carámbula for General Motors marketer FutureBrand as part of re-design of Chevrolet in 2006. After the expiry of the exclusivity period, the commercial version of the font (Klavika Condensed) was released to the public in the fall of 2008. Chevrolet continued using Klavika until replacing it with custom fonts (Durant and Louis) around 2013.
Atlassian has been using this since their re-branding in October 2011.  
Starting with Super Bowl XLVII in 2013, CBS used Klavika in their sports broadcasts. It was also used in sister network CBS Sports Network. They switched to FF DIN starting with Super Bowl 50 in 2016.
Online gaming site Ijji uses Klavika.
Klavika is used in the logo and visual identity of Young Life.
For World Youth Day 2011
Visual Identification of city of Lublin, Poland.
Visual Identification of city of Katowice, Poland. (Klavika CH) Katowice Visual Identification Document
Košice Transport Company (Dopravný podnik mesta Košice) has been using the font since 2010.
The Glasgow Subway system now uses the font in all its recently re-branded visual identity.
Motorola Mobility uses this font as their some ads of Motorola's homepage and user's manual titles.
Portuguese college Instituto Superior Técnico uses this typeface since its 2012 re-branding.
University of Applied Sciences, Worms in its new logo, starting 1st of September 2014.
Irish public TV channel RTÉ One started using the font in its presentation graphics from 1st January 2014.
Klavika is the main corporate typeface of Advanced Micro Devices since 2013 and is used along with Calibri.
IAM RoadSmart has used Klavika as its main typeface since rebranding in 2016.
YG Entertainment uses Klavika since its brand identity renewal in 2013.
Polish Armed Forces (SZRP) and its service branches (Land Forces, Navy, Air Force, Special Forces, Territorial Defence Force) used Klavika typeface for their logo.

References

External links
Klavika at Process Type Foundry

Typefaces and fonts introduced in 2004
Typefaces with text figures
Geometric sans-serif typefaces
Typefaces designed by Eric Olson